Valašské Příkazy is a municipality and village in Zlín District in the Zlín Region of the Czech Republic. It has about 300 inhabitants.

History
The first written mention of Valašské Příkazy is from 1503.

From 1 January 2021, Valašské Příkazy is no longer a part of Vsetín District and belongs to Zlín District.

References

Villages in Zlín District
Moravian Wallachia